Orazio Minimi (1646–1701) was a Roman Catholic prelate who served as Bishop of Segni (1699–1701).

Biography
Orazio Minimi was born in Viterbo, Italy and ordained a priest on 29 Sep 1670.
On 5 Oct 1699, he was appointed during the papacy of Pope Innocent XII as Bishop of Segni.
On 11 Oct 1699, he was consecrated bishop by Pier Matteo Petrucci, Cardinal-Priest of San Marcello al Corso, with Giovanni Andrea Monreale, Archbishop of Reggio Calabria, and Tommaso Guzzoni, Bishop of Sora, serving as co-consecrators. 
He served as Bishop of Segni until his death in July 1701.

References

External links and additional sources
 (for Chronology of Bishops) 
 (for Chronology of Bishops)  

17th-century Italian Roman Catholic bishops
18th-century Italian Roman Catholic bishops
Bishops appointed by Pope Innocent XII
1646 births
1701 deaths